Nakaiwa Dam is a gravity dam located in Tochigi prefecture in Japan. The dam is used for power production. The catchment area of the dam is 697 km2. The dam impounds about 12  ha of land when full and can store 1488 thousand cubic meters of water. The construction of the dam was started on 1922 and completed in 1924.

References

Dams in Tochigi Prefecture
1924 establishments in Japan